Coral Springs Kicks were an American soccer team based in Coral Springs, Florida that played in the USISL. The Kicks were led by Michael Araujo, whose 11 assists were the most in the USISL.

Year-by-year

1993 Standings

Defunct soccer clubs in Florida
Soccer clubs in Miami
Association football clubs established in 1993
Association football clubs disestablished in 1993
Coral Springs, Florida
1993 establishments in Florida
1993 disestablishments in Florida